Prusiek  (Prusik) is a village in the administrative district of Gmina Sanok, within Sanok County, Subcarpathian Voivodeship, in south-eastern Poland.

The village has a population of 700.

18 February 1846 - beginning of the Galician peasant revolt.

References

Prusiek